Red Light Lizzie (fl. 1860 –1875) was the pseudonym of an American madam, procuress and underworld figure in New York City during the mid-to late 19th century.

During the 1860s and 1870s, she controlled much of New York City's prostitution, along with Jane the Grabber. Like her rival, Lizzie employed a number of men and women to travel to rural communities in Upstate New York and New England to lure young girls to the city with promises of well-paying jobs. Some men were paid by Lizzie to bring girls into dive bars and, similar to Shanghaiing, would be given drugged alcohol. The victims would then be forced into prostitution, either by working in her brothels, or being "sold" to similar establishments. Both she and Jane the Grabber specialized in procuring women from wealthy families.

She owned at least twelve "houses of ill-repute" and was so successful as a procurer that she sent a monthly circular letter to all of her clients.

References

Further reading
Fido, Martin. The Chronicle of Crime: The Infamous Villains of Modern History and Their Hideous Crimes. London: Carlton, 2000. 
Petronius. New York Unexpurgated: An Amoral Guide for the Jaded, Tired, Evil, Non-conforming, Corrupt, Condemned, and the Curious, Humans and Otherwise, to Under Underground Manhattan. New York: Matrix House, 1966.

Year of birth missing
Year of death missing
American pimps
American brothel owners and madams
Criminals from New York City
People from New York City
American female organized crime figures
19th-century American businesspeople
19th-century American businesswomen